Fernando Carreño Colombo (born 15 January 1979) is an Italian-Uruguayan footballer who lately played as defender for Cerro. He previously spent his career at various foreign clubs.

External links
 Profile & Statistics at Guardian's Stats Centre

1979 births
Living people
Footballers from Montevideo
Uruguayan people of Italian descent
Uruguayan footballers
Uruguay under-20 international footballers
Uruguayan expatriate footballers
Uruguayan expatriate sportspeople in Switzerland
Peñarol players
BSC Young Boys players
FC Aarau players
SC Rheindorf Altach players
Uruguayan Primera División players
Swiss Super League players
Austrian Football Bundesliga players
Expatriate footballers in China
Qingdao Hainiu F.C. (1990) players
Expatriate footballers in Switzerland
Expatriate footballers in Austria
Uruguayan expatriate sportspeople in China
Sud América players
Association football defenders